Benjamin Brafman (born July 21, 1948) is a prominent American criminal defense attorney and founder of the Manhattan-based firm Brafman & Associates, P.C. Brafman is known for representing many high-profile defendants, including celebrities, accused Mafia members, and political figures.

Early life and education 
Brafman grew up in Brooklyn and Belle Harbor, Queens, a son of Holocaust survivors. Brafman's family fled from Europe to Cuba on their way to the United States just before World War II. He went to a Yeshiva High School and took night classes at Brooklyn College, majoring in anthropology and graduated with a Bachelor of Arts degree.

Brafman received his Juris Doctor with distinction from Ohio Northern University College of Law. He also earned an LL.M. from New York University School of Law. In May 2014, Brafman was awarded an honorary degree by Ohio Northern University College of Law.

Career 
After graduating from law school, admitted to the New York State Bar in 1975, Brafman worked for a criminal defense firm for two years, then became an Assistant District Attorney in the Manhattan District Attorney's Office. In 1980, Brafman started his own law firm in Manhattan.

Brafman has represented a number of notable figures, including Jacob Arabo, James Patino (who was cleared of all charges in the death of Yusef Hawkins), Peter Gatien, Plaxico Burress, Michael Jackson, Carl Kruger, Charles Kushner, Marvell Scott, Sean Combs ("Puff Daddy"), Mafia boss Vincent "Chin" Gigante, Mafia underboss Salvatore "Sammy the Bull" Gravano, online gambling figure Jay Cohen, Dominique Strauss-Kahn, Rabbi Menachem Youlus, political pundit Dinesh D'Souza, high-profile attorney Sanford Rubenstein, Martin Shkreli, and Harvey Weinstein.

Notable cases 
Brafman slowly established his reputation as a celebrity lawyer through a series of high-profile cases.

Sean "P. Diddy" Combs trial 
Brafman’s profile rose following the acquittal of client Sean "P. Diddy" Combs, on 1999 illegal weapons and bribery charges. The criminal charges stemmed from a nightclub brawl, while accompanied by then-girlfriend Jennifer Lopez, and Combs's usual entourage, and was witnessed by over 100 other people. Numerous prosecution witnesses testified to Combs's culpability; a not guilty verdict was decreed on all charges.

Plaxico Burress shooting 

On November 30, 2008, Brafman was hired to represent NFL star Plaxico Burress who, on August 3, 2009, was indicted on two counts of criminal possession of a weapon, and one count of reckless endangerment. Burress pleaded guilty to a weapons charge and was sentenced to two years in prison.

Dominique Strauss-Kahn 

In 2011, Brafman represented former IMF head Dominique Strauss-Kahn in a sexual assault case involving a member of the housekeeping staff of an upscale New York City hotel. Brafman and Strauss-Kahn's other lawyer, William W. Taylor, III, of Zuckerman Spaeder LLP, gained first a recommendation that charges be dropped from New York County District Attorney Cyrus Vance, and then charges dropped by New York State Supreme Court Justice Michael Obus.

Brafman discussed his defense of Strauss-Kahn on Charlie Rose in February, 2012.

Martin Wolmark 

In 2014 and 2015, Brafman represented Martin Wolmark of the Epstein-Wolmark gang, an outfit that had plotted the kidnap and torture of Jewish husbands to coerce them into granting their wives gets (religious divorces). Wolmark pled guilty to the charges, and was sentenced to three years in prison.

Martin Shkreli 

In early 2016, Martin Shkreli retained Brafman to defend him. In a 2017 jury trial, Shkreli was found guilty on two counts of securities fraud and one count of conspiracy to commit securities fraud. He was sentenced to seven years in prison.

Harvey Weinstein 

Former film producer Harvey Weinstein hired Brafman in 2017, after numerous sexual abuse allegations against him from prominent members of Hollywood resulted in charges and a criminal trial.

Brafman represented Weinstein at his arraignment on May 25, 2018 in Manhattan Criminal Court on charges of first-degree rape and third-degree rape in one case, and first-degree criminal sex act in another case. Brafman said in an interview: "Mr. Weinstein did not invent the casting couch in Hollywood. Bad behavior is not on trial in this case."

In January 2019, Brafman and Weinstein issued a joint statement officially parting ways.
Weinstein would subsequently get convicted on several charges, and sentenced to 23 years in prison.

Personal life 
Brafman is a practicing Orthodox Jew.

His wife, Lynda, is a librarian. The Brafmans lived in a "cramped Forest Hills apartment" early in their marriage and, by 1998, lived in an "enormous Long Island brick mansion." Brafman has lived in the Five Towns area of Long Island since 1981. The couple have two children, Jennifer and David, and a number of grandchildren.

Brafman's older brother, Aaron, was an Orthodox rabbi in Far Rockaway, Queens.

Brafman is a self-described "short Jewish guy," standing five feet, six inches tall.

References 

1948 births
American Orthodox Jews
Brooklyn College alumni
Criminal defense lawyers
Jewish American attorneys
Living people
New York University School of Law alumni
New York (state) lawyers
Claude W. Pettit College of Law alumni
People from Lawrence, Nassau County, New York
21st-century American Jews